WJDP-LD, virtual and VHF digital channel 11, is a low-powered IBN Television-affiliated television station serving Sevier County, Tennessee, United States that is licensed to Pigeon Forge. The station is owned by Edge Spectrum.

Sevier County was also locally served by Sevierville-licensed WJZC-LP, which was a translator of independent station WKNX-TV (channel 7) in Knoxville until its license was cancelled on April 30, 2021.

History 
The station was established on September 24, 2010 as W11DI-D. At the time of its sign-on in 2011 as WJDP-LD, it was an affiliate of Legacy TV (now The Walk TV), and was under ownership of Richard C. and Lisa Goetz of Hendersonville. At some point in 2013, the station was sold to EICB TV East, LLC. The station signed off in early 2014, and was off the air indefinitely until about 2017, when it began broadcasting from IBN Television.

External links

EICB TV

Television stations in Tennessee
Sevier County, Tennessee
Low-power television stations in the United States
Television channels and stations established in 2011
2011 establishments in Tennessee